The list of provincial parks of the Okanagan contains the provincial parks located within this geographic region of the province of British Columbia. It includes parks from the three regional districts of Central Okanagan, North Okanagan and Okanagan-Similkameen. These parks are administered by BC Parks under the jurisdiction of the Ministry of Environment and Climate Change Strategy.

Parks

Central Okanagan

North Okanagan

Okanagan-Similkameen

External links 

Map of provincial parks in the Okanagan on env.gov.bc.ca

 
Provincial parks
British Columbia, Okanagan
Okanagan